The Light heavyweight competition at the 2013 AIBA World Boxing Championships was held from 16–26 October 2013. Boxers were limited to a weight of 81 kilograms.

Medalists

Seeds

  Adilbek Niyazymbetov (final)
  Julio César la Cruz (champion)
  Nikita Ivanov (quarterfinals)
  Oybek Mamazulunov (semifinals)
  Peter Mullenberg (quarterfinals)
  Joe Ward (semifinals)
  Hrvoje Sep (second round)
  Siarhei Novikau (third round)
  Petru Ciobanu (second round)
  Abdelhafid Benchabla (quarterfinals)

Draw

Finals

Top half

Section 1

Section 2

Bottom half

Section 3

Section 4

References
Draw

2013 AIBA World Boxing Championships